77 Walmgate is a timber framed building in the city centre of York, in England.

The oldest part of the building is the 15th century cross wing, the west part of the current building, with its gable end to Walmgate.  A hall range was added in the 16th century, and this is the eastern part of the current building.  Its timber frame is exposed, and its ogee braces are typical of the period.  At some point, the ground floor was rebuilt in brick, but the upper floor is still jettied over it.

A wing was added at the rear in the early 18th century, and the building was altered in the 19th and 20th centuries.  Inside, many historic features survive, including wooden panelling, a reset staircase, and a fireplace on the first floor.

The building was grade II* listed in 1954.  In 1957, it was purchased by the York Conservation Trust, who let it as a shop with a flat above.

References

Walmgate 77
Houses completed in the 15th century
Houses in North Yorkshire
Timber framed buildings in Yorkshire
Walmgate